Landrethun-le-Nord is a commune in the Pas-de-Calais department in the Hauts-de-France region of France.

Geography

History
The area was severely bombed during 1944 as the Germans chose this commune to host the V-3 cannon launch site during World War II.

Population

Places of interest
 The church of St.Martin, dating from the twentieth century.
 The Second World War Fortress of Mimoyecques.

See also
Communes of the Pas-de-Calais department

References

Landrethunlenord